Sarah Dessen (born June 6, 1970) is an American novelist who lives in Chapel Hill, North Carolina. Born in Illinois, Dessen graduated from the University of North Carolina-Chapel Hill. Her first book, That Summer, was published in 1996. She has since published more than a dozen other novels and novellas. In 2017, Dessen won the Margaret Edwards Award for some of her work. Two of her books were adapted into the 2003 film How to Deal.

Early life, education and personal life 
Dessen was born in Evanston, Illinois, on June 6, 1970, to Alan and Cynthia Dessen, who were both professors at the University of North Carolina, teaching Shakespearean literature and classics.

As a teenager, Dessen was very shy and quiet. She became involved with a 21-year-old when she was 15 but cut all contact with him shortly after. In a piece penned for Seventeen, Dessen wrote "for many years afterward, I took total blame for everything that happened between me and T. After all, I was a bad kid. I did drugs, I lied to my mom. You can't just hang out with a guy and not expect him to get ideas, I told myself. You should have known better. But maybe he should have. When I turned 21, I remember making a point, regularly, to look at teens and ask myself whether I'd want to hang out with them, much less date one. The answer was always a flat, immediate no. They were kids. I was an adult. End of story."

Dessen attended Greensboro College in Greensboro, North Carolina, but dropped out before the end of the first semester. Upon moving back home she enrolled at the University of North Carolina-Chapel Hill, to take classes in creative writing, resulting in her graduating with highest honors in 1993. 

Today Dessen lives in Chapel Hill, North Carolina, with her husband Jay and daughter Sasha Clementine.

Career 
Dessen waitressed at the Flying Burrito restaurant in Chapel Hill and was Lee Smith's assistant while launching her writing career. It was Smith who passed one of Dessen's manuscripts to an agent. After the 1996 publication of her first book, That Summer, Dessen continued working at the restaurant. Following the publication of Dreamland, Dessen taught at the University of North Carolina- Chapel Hill. She became a full-time writer before the 2006 release of Just Listen. 

Dessen's Along for the Ride made the New York Times Best Sellers List in 2009. After its publication, Dessen was referred to as a "best-seller machine".

In November 2019, an Aberdeen News article quoted a comment from 2016 by a Northern State University alumna regarding the University's 'Common Read' program, which identifies books "representing diverse points of view" for undergraduate students to read as part of their curriculum. The student, Brooke Nelson, said she became involved with the program "simply so I could stop them from ever choosing Sarah Dessen." Regarding Dessen's book, Nelson stated, "She’s fine for teen girls, but definitely not up to the level of Common Read."

Dessen posted parts of this interview that were critical of her on Twitter, redacting Nelson's name and the institution but stating that the comments were "mean and cruel”. Her post was supported by a number of authors, including Jodi Picoult, Jennifer Weiner, Siobhan Vivian, and Roxane Gay. Following this, Northern State University issued an apology for the alumna's comments. 

Dessen subsequently deleted her tweet and apologized for her remarks, acknowledging that it had resulted in her fans connecting her comments with their source to identify and harass Nelson that led to the former student deleting her social media accounts. Dessen stated, "With a platform and a following, I have a responsibility to be aware of what I put out there." Several of the other authors who had supported Dessen initially also apologized to Nelson, noting that they had supported Dessen’s expression of her feelings but did not support the subsequent identification and bullying of Nelson.

Awards and honors 
Some of her novels have been among the ALA's "Best Fiction for Young Adults" selections:  That Summer (1997), Someone Like You (1999), Keeping the Moon (2000), Dreamland (2001), This Lullaby (2003), Just Listen (2007), and Along for the Ride (2010).
Someone Like You was also one of the two winners of the 1999 "School Library Journal Best Book" award, and Keeping the Moon was the sole winner the next year.

In 2017, Dessen was awarded the Margaret A. Edwards Award for her novels Dreamland (2001), Keeping the Moon (2000), Just Listen (2007), The Truth About Forever (2004), Along for the Ride (2010), What Happened to Goodbye (2011), and This Lullaby (2002).

Themes and writing style 
In 2017, Dessen was interviewed by Anna Gragert. During the interview, Gragert asked Dessen about the style she uses in some of her books, otherwise known as "effortless perfection". Dessen describes this term as the young girls in her books being able to have friends, look good, be a good student and have one's life together, and to make it look easy. At the start of the book, the reader is supposed to relate with the main characters and throughout their changes in the book, the reader should see that it is okay to not have everything together and not be perfect. Gragert asked Dessen about her anxiety coping mechanisms because writing tends to cause an author to be anxious. Dessen said that she likes to exercise and read in her free time because all writers are going to be anxious, it's part of the process, but it also opens their mind more because they see the world differently than readers.

Bibliography
 1996 – That Summer 
 1998 – Someone Like You
 1999 – Keeping the Moon (also known as Last Chance) 
 2000 – Dreamland 
 2002 – This Lullaby
 2004 – The Truth About Forever 
 2006 – Just Listen 
 2008 – Lock and Key 
 2009 – Along for the Ride
 2010 – Infinity (novella)
 2011 – What Happened to Goodbye 
 2013 – The Moon and More 
 2015 – Saint Anything
 2017 – Once and for All 
 2019 –The Rest of the Story

Film adaptations 
The 2003 romantic comedy-drama film How to Deal starring Mandy Moore, Allison Janney, Dylan Baker, Peter Gallagher and Trent Ford was based on both That Summer and Someone Like You.

On May 30, 2019, it was announced that Netflix had purchased the rights to adapt three of Dessen's books into films: This Lullaby, Along for the Ride, and Once and for All. In June 2021, it was announced The Truth About Forever was added to the Dessen books obtained by Netflix to be adapted into a feature film.

Along for the Ride was released on May 6, 2022.

References

External links

 Official website
 
 

1970 births
20th-century American novelists
Living people
Novelists from North Carolina
People from Chapel Hill, North Carolina
Writers from Evanston, Illinois
University of North Carolina at Chapel Hill alumni
American young adult novelists
21st-century American novelists
American women novelists
20th-century American women writers
Women writers of young adult literature
21st-century American women writers
Greensboro College alumni
Novelists from Illinois
Shorty Award winners